Dorcadion maljushenkoi is a species of beetle in the family Cerambycidae. It was described by Pic in 1908. It is known from the Caucasus.

References

maljushenkoi
Beetles described in 1908